Fritz Baumgarten (18 August 1883, Reudnitz (now part of Leipzig) – 3 November 1966, Leipzig) was a German illustrator.

He illustrated countless children's books in light pen works, coloured richly and very painterly with watercolours. His style was very modern, loose and impressionistic, but still with strong roots in life-drawing, animals drawing and academic composition.

His fantasy world was populated with temperate forests' animals, elves and fairies, farm animals, children and teddy bears. His whole work has a definite feeling of possible, of real, of lived through scenes, almost down to earth, while at the same time being totally free-floating in imagination, almost psychedelic. After a stopover in Sachsenberg-Georgenthal, where the artist was conscripted to work in an armaments factory, the Baumgartens moved to Reichenbach. In the summer of 1946 the family returned to the Connewitz district of Leipzig. Fritz Baumgarten, who joined the Free German Trade Union Confederation around the mid-1950s, immediately made contact with various publishers in West and East Germany, such as Lange & Meuche Verlag, Scholz Verlag, Engelbert Dessart Verlag, Titania Verlag and others. m. Disguised as "small pictures for the little nieces and nephews" the artist sent his illustrations to West Germany. The fee was sent to him in kind or credited to accounts in the West. Around the beginning of the 1960s, his creative power waned, Fritz Baumgarten was soon 80 years old, and the number of his annually published children's and picture books decreased significantly.

References
German Wikipedia page devoted to Fritz Baumgarten with a good list of some of his printed works

1883 births
1966 deaths
Artists from Leipzig
20th-century German painters
20th-century German male artists
German male painters
German children's book illustrators
Fantasy artists